Malmö Castle is a fortress located in Malmö, Scania, Sweden. 
It is owned by the Swedish state and is managed by the State Property Agency. Malmöhus is part of Malmö Museums.

History
The first castle was founded in 1434 by King Eric of Pomerania. This structure was partially demolished in early 16th century , and a new one was built in its place in the 1530s by King Christian III of Denmark. Historically, this fortress was one of the most important strongholds of Denmark.

The castle was for five years (1568–1573) the prison of James Hepburn, 4th Earl of Bothwell, third husband of Mary, Queen of Scots. The earl was taken into custody on the orders of the Protestant Danish king Frederick II of Denmark when his ship ran aground in Bergen, Norway during a storm. He was sent to Malmö Castle to be imprisoned, although he had previously been released from Tower of London for lack of evidence in the murder of Mary's second husband, Henry Stuart, Lord Darnley. As a bachelor, Frederick II courted Elizabeth I of England and was made a Knight of the Garter. Some sources suggest a second reason for the involvement in this matter by the Danish king; he is thought to have held hopes of collecting a ransom from Scotland. However, the Earl of Bothwell died in 1578 in Dragsholm Castle, Zealand, where he had been moved after the first five years in Danish captivity, without ever being the subject of Danish-Scottish negotiations for his release.

References

External links

 Malmö Castle
 The Association of Castles and Museums around the Baltic Sea

Buildings and structures in Malmö
Castles in Skåne County
Museums in Skåne County
Tourist attractions in Malmö